San Juan County is the name of four counties in the United States:

 San Juan County, Colorado
 San Juan County, New Mexico
 San Juan County, Utah
 San Juan County, Washington